Bengal Chatkal Mazdoor Union is a trade union of jute mill workers in West Bengal, India. The union is affiliated to the Centre of Indian Trade Unions. The general secretary of BCMU is Anadi Kumar Sahu and the president is Tarit Baran Topdar.

Trade unions in India
Centre of Indian Trade Unions
Jute industry trade unions